portal: Libraries and the Academy is an academic journal established in 2001. It focuses on the role of libraries within the academy, addressing topics related to information technology, library administration, and the place of the library in an institution’s educational and research mission. It is particularly given to exploration of the effects of technology on scholarship. The journal has been recognized for excellence by the Council of Editors of Learned Journals. Articles have also been awarded the American Library Association Jesse H. Shera Award for Excellence in Published Research. The journal is published quarterly by the Johns Hopkins University Press.

Abstracting & Indexing 
The journal is abstracted and indexed in Scopus, Social Science Citation Index, Library and Information Science Abstracts, and MLA - Modern Language Association Database.

According to the Journal Citation Reports, the journal has a 2016 impact factor of 1.290, ranking it 40th out of 85 journals in the category "Information Science & Library Science."

References

External links
 
 portal at Project MUSE

Library science journals
Publications established in 2001
Johns Hopkins University Press academic journals
Quarterly journals
English-language journals